Walter King may refer to:

 Walter Woolf King (1899–1984), American actor and singer
 King Fleming (Walter "King" Fleming, 1922–2014), American musician
 Walter King Stapleton (born 1934), United States federal judge
 Walter King Venning (1882–1964), British Army general
 Walter K. Wilson Jr. (Walter King Wilson, Jr., 1906–1985), U.S. Army general
 Gilbert Walter King (1871–1937), British judge who served in China